Aidos Sultangali (born 7 February 1996) is a Kazakh Greco-Roman wrestler. He is a two-time bronze medalist in the 60kg event at the World Wrestling Championships. He won the gold medal in his event at the 2021 Asian Wrestling Championships held in Almaty, Kazakhstan.

Career 

At the 2017 Asian Indoor and Martial Arts Games held in Ashgabat, Turkmenistan, he won one of the bronze medals in the 59 kg event. He won one of the bronze medals in the 60 kg event at the 2018 World Wrestling Championships held in Budapest, Hungary.

He represented Kazakhstan at the 2019 Military World Games held in Wuhan, China and he won one of the bronze medals in the 60 kg event. In 2021, he won the gold medal in the 63 kg event at the Matteo Pellicone Ranking Series 2021 held in Rome, Italy. A month later, he won the gold medal in the 60 kg event at the 2021 Asian Wrestling Championships held in Almaty, Kazakhstan. In October 2021, he competed in the 60 kg event at the World Wrestling Championships held in Oslo, Norway.

He won one of the bronze medals in the 60 kg event at the 2022 World Wrestling Championships held in Belgrade, Serbia. He defeated Krisztián Kecskeméti of Hungary in his bronze medal match.

Achievements

References

External links 

 

Living people
1996 births
Place of birth missing (living people)
Kazakhstani male sport wrestlers
World Wrestling Championships medalists
Asian Wrestling Championships medalists
21st-century Kazakhstani people